There are two townlands with the name Newtown, in the Barony of Kilnamanagh Upper in County Tipperary, Ireland. 
Newtown in the civil parish of Ballycahill
Newtown in the civil parish of Templebeg
There are nineteen townlands known as Newtown in the whole of County Tipperary.

References

Townlands of County Tipperary